The 2019 Brest Challenger was a professional tennis tournament played on hard courts. It was the fifth edition of the tournament which was part of the 2019 ATP Challenger Tour. It took place in Brest, France between 21 and 27 October 2019.

Singles main-draw entrants

Seeds

 1 Rankings are as of 14 October 2019.

Other entrants
The following players received wildcards into the singles main draw:
  Dan Added
  Geoffrey Blancaneaux
  Quentin Halys
  Arthur Reymond
  Rayane Roumane

The following player received entry into the singles main draw as a special exempt:
  Ugo Humbert

The following players received entry from the qualifying draw:
  Maxime Hamou
  Illya Marchenko

Champions

Singles

  Ugo Humbert def.  Evgeny Donskoy 6–2, 6–3.

Doubles

  Denys Molchanov /  Andrei Vasilevski def.  Andrea Vavassori /  David Vega Hernández 6–3, 6–1.

References

2019 ATP Challenger Tour
2019 in French tennis
October 2019 sports events in France
Brest Challenger